Louis Allmendiger, AIA, was an American architect practicing in New York City in the early twentieth century. He is best known as the architect of the Russian Orthodox Cathedral of the Transfiguration of Our Lord (1916–1921) in Brooklyn, New York.

References	

Defunct architecture firms based in New York City
Architects of cathedrals
20th-century American architects
Year of birth missing
Year of death missing